<onlyinclude>

May 2021

See also

References

killings by law enforcement officers
 05